Buneva Point (‘Nos Buneva’ \'nos 'bu-ne-va\) is the sharp rocky point on the northwest coast of Alexander Island in Antarctica projecting 1 km west-southwestwards into Lazarev Bay just south of the terminus of Lennon Glacier. It is formed by the north extremity of the homonymous rocky coastal ridge extending 3.7 km in southeast direction.

The feature is named after Mara Buneva (1902-1928), heroine of the Bulgarian liberation movement in Macedonia.

Location
British mapping in 1991.

Maps
 British Antarctic Territory. Scale 1:250000 topographic map. Sheet SR19-20/5. APC UK, 1991
 Antarctic Digital Database (ADD). Scale 1:250000 topographic map of Antarctica. Scientific Committee on Antarctic Research (SCAR). Since 1993, regularly upgraded and updated

References
 Bulgarian Antarctic Gazetteer. Antarctic Place-names Commission. (details in Bulgarian, basic data in English)
 Buneva Point. SCAR Composite Gazetteer of Antarctica

External links
 Buneva Point. Copernix satellite image

Headlands of Alexander Island
Bulgaria and the Antarctic